Octobre is a studio album released in 2015 by Québécois néo-trad band Les Cowboys Fringants.  It reached number 1 in Quebec music charts during the week of October 23–29, 2015, and peaked at number 107 on the charts in France.

Track listing
 "Octobre" – 3:36
 "Bye Bye Lou" – 3:41
 "La la la" – 2:41
 "Les vers de terre" – 4:17
 "Pizza Galaxie" – 4:25
 "Les feuilles mortes" – 3:59
 "So So" – 3:08
 "La cave" – 3:02
 "Marine marchande" – 4:25
 "Oktoberfest" – 1:02
 "La dévisse" – 4:21
 "Mon grand-père" – 4:16
 "Louis Hébert" – 4:19
 "Pub royal" – 3:42

Charts

References

Les Cowboys Fringants albums